Becker Township may refer to one of two municipalities in the U.S. state of Minnesota:
Becker Township, Cass County, Minnesota
Becker Township, Sherburne County, Minnesota

See also 
Becker Township (disambiguation)

Minnesota township disambiguation pages